The People's Park in the Sky, often simply called People's Park and originally named Palace in the Sky, is a historical urban park in Tagaytay, Cavite, Philippines. 

The park was converted from an incomplete mansion, known as the Palace in the Sky built during the Marcos era to host the visit of US President Ronald Reagan. Work stopped when Reagan canceled his visit, and the incomplete scaffolding of the mansion remained intact.

The Shrine of Our Lady, Mother of Fair Love and a Doppler weather radar station maintained by the Philippine Atmospheric, Geophysical and Astronomical Services Administration (PAGASA) is also within the park.

History

During the Marcos administration, First Lady Imelda Marcos decided to build a mansion atop Mount Sungay, which was at that time was government-owned land. The summit before was used by the Bureau of Air Transport as a radar station. Construction in the mansion began in 1981, and the work was a difficult due to the height of the summit. As such, roads were built specially for this purpose, enabling supplies to reach the  summit of the  Mount Gonzales. The mountain was leveled by bulldozers, and farmers living on the mountainside were asked to relocate. Construction of the mansion was hastened when US President Ronald Reagan announced his intention to visit the Philippines in November of 1983. It was reported that the Marcos administration planned to accommodate Reagan at the then-completed mansion. 

Following the deposition of the Marcos regime in the People Power Revolution, critics described the unfinished mansion as a symbol of the Marcos administration's excess.

Marian chapel

The Shrine of Our Lady, Mother of Fair Love is located within the People's Park in the Sky. The shrine was installed on December 15, 1974, with the installation of the image of the Blessed Virgin Mary and the child Jesus by Hernan D. Reyes, aided by four high school students and two workers. During the construction of the Palace in the Sky in 1981, workers were unable to blast a huge rock containing the image of the Blessed Virgin  Mary with several dynamite blasts. The rock was left intact, after the discovery of the image.

References

Parks in the Philippines
Buildings and structures in Tagaytay
Tourist attractions in Cavite